G60 may refer to

Automobiles
 Dorcen G60, a 2018–present Chinese compact SUV
 Dorcen G60s, a 2019–present Chinese compact SUV
 Ginetta G60, a 2012–2015 British sports car
 Ginetta G60-LT-P1, a 2018 British race car
 Toyota Century (G60), a 2018–present Japanese full-size luxury sedan
 Volkswagen G60 engine, an inline-four cylinder automobile petrol engines

Highways
 G60 Shanghai–Kunming Expressway, an expressway in China